Two Most Honorable Knights is a Hong Kong television series adapted from Gu Long's novel Juedai Shuangjiao. The series was first aired on TVB in Hong Kong in 1988.

Cast
 Note: Some of the characters' names are in Cantonese romanisation.

 Tony Leung as Siu-yu-yee (Kong Siu-yu)
 Hugo Ng as Fa Mo-kuet
 Kitty Lai as Tit Sum-lan
 Shallin Tse as So Ying
 Maggie Chan as Yiu-yuet
 Michael Miu as Kong Fung
 Elliot Ngok as Yin Nam-tin
 Eddie Kwan as Kong Yuk-long
 Yeung Chak-lam as Kong Pit-hok
 Jamie Chik as Fa Yuet-no
 Sandra Ng as Third Lady
 Eugina Lau as Cheung Ching
 Wong Wan-choi as Ngai Mo-nga
 Law Lan as Granny Fa

External links
 
 Two Most Honorable Knights review on spcnet.tv

Hong Kong wuxia television series
Works based on Juedai Shuangjiao
TVB dramas
1988 Hong Kong television series debuts
1988 Hong Kong television series endings
Cantonese-language television shows
Television shows based on works by Gu Long